Hloubětín tram depot is a tram and trolleybus depot in Hloubětín that has been part of the Prague tram network since 1951. The depot celebrated fifty years of service in 2001.

References

Rail transport in Prague
Buildings and structures in Prague
Buildings and structures completed in 1951
Tram depots
1951 establishments in Czechoslovakia
20th-century architecture in the Czech Republic